Events from the year 1681 in art.

Events

Works

 Caius Gabriel Cibber - Statue of Charles II, Soho Square
 Jean Cotelle - Marriage at Cana (for Notre Dame de Paris)
 Claude Lorrain - Landscape with Christ appearing to Mary Magdalen
 Carlo Maratta - Apollo Chasing Daphne

Births 
March 30 - Pieter Snyers, Flemish art collector, painter, draughtsman, engraver (died 1752)
April 9 – Nicolas Edelinck, French-born engraver, son of Gerard Edelinck (died 1767)
April 18 – Girolamo Donnini, Italian painter of the Baroque period (died 1743)
December 14 – Giuseppe Valentini, Italian violinist, painter, poet, and composer (died 1753)
date unknown
Francesco Conti, Italian Venetian painter (died 1760)
Johann Jakob Frey the Elder, Swiss engraver (died 1752)
Peter Monamy, English marine painter (died 1749)
Girolamo Odam, Italian painter, pastel portraitist and landscape artist, as well as wood engraver (died 1718)

Deaths
February 11 – Gerard Soest, Dutch painter, father of Gerard ter Borch (born 1600)
March 12
Giuseppe Bonati, Italian painter of the Baroque period, active in Rome and Ferrara (born 1635)
Frans van Mieris, Sr., Dutch genre and portrait painter (born 1635)
April 12 – Pietro Paolini, Italian painter of still lifes and cabinet pictures (born 1603)
April 23 - Justus Sustermans, Flemish painter in the Baroque style (born 1597)
June 1 – Cornelis Saftleven, Dutch painter of the Baroque period (born 1607)
November 11 - Jacob Marrel, Dutch still-life painter (born 1613)
December 8 – Gerard ter Borch, Dutch subject painter (born 1617)
December 10 - Gaspard Marsy, French sculptor (born 1624)
date unknown
Giovanni Domenico Cerrini, Italian painter from the Bolognese School (born 1609)
Pierfrancesco Cittadini, Italian painter of still life (born 1616)
Giacinto Gimignani, Italian painter, active mainly in Rome, during the Baroque period (born 1606)
Albrecht Kauw, Swiss still-life painter, cartographer and a painter of vedute (born 1621)
Juan Rizi, Spanish painter (born 1600)
Diego Quispe Tito, Peruvian painter, leader of the Cuzco School of painting (born 1611)

 
Years of the 17th century in art
1680s in art